The Hellenic Civil Aviation Authority, abbreviated HCAA, is a department of the Greek government under the Ministry of Infrastructure, Transport and Networks. It is involved in air traffic control, aeronautical communications, airport operations, aircraft registration and inspection, licensing of civil air operators, and personnel certification.

The headquarters of the HCAA are located at Glyfada, near the old Ellinikon Airport.

HCAA communications facilities

The Hellenic CAA uses a number of remotely operated VHF radio stations for civil aviation communications at the following locations:
 Ymittos (near Athens)
 Akarnanika Mountains
 Thassos Island
 Spergioli
 Moustakos
 Monastiri
 Sitia
 Geraneia Mountains

Air Traffic Control radar
The HCAA uses a number of radar stations:
 Ymittos (near Athens), primary
 Mount Pilion (SSR)
 Levkas Island (SSR)
 Kythira (SSR)
 Crete (SSR)
 Athens International Airport, Kamara and Merenta hills (approach)
 Hellenikon (approach)
 Thessaloniki/Peraia (approach) 
 Heraklion (approach)
 Rhodes (approach)
 Corfu (approach)
The radar stations are integrated using the PALLAS system (Phased Automation of the heLLenic ATC radar System).

HCAA Flying Unit
The agency operates a small fleet of aircraft for navigational aid calibration activities. The current fleet is the following:

References

External links

 HCAA website
 Civil Aviation in Greece, by George Hatzipanagos 
 

Civil aviation in Greece
Greece
Air navigation service providers
Elliniko-Argyroupoli
Aviation organizations based in Greece